Ćevapi, ćevapčići (formal: diminutive;) is a grilled dish of minced meat found traditionally in the countries of southeast Europe (the Balkans). It is considered a national dish of Bosnia and Herzegovina and Serbia and is also common in Croatia,  Montenegro, Kosovo, North Macedonia, Slovenia, Romania, Albania and Austria.

They are usually served in groups of five to ten pieces on a plate or in a flatbread (lepina or somun), often with chopped onions, sour cream, kajmak (milk cream), ajvar (relish), and salt.

Bosnian ćevapi are made from two types of minced beef meat, hand-mixed and formed with a funnel, while formed ćevapi are grilled. Serbian ćevapčići are made of beef, lamb or pork, or a mixture.

Name and etymology

The word ćevap is derived from the Ottoman Turkish kebap. The word is sometimes used in conjunction with the common South Slavic diminutive ending -čići. ; ;  / ;  ; ; . The word ćevapi is plural; the singular form ćevap is rarely used, as a typical serving consists of several ćevapi.

History

During the Ottoman administration, hajduks (rebels, outlaws) made the hajdučki ćevap ("hajduk ćevap"), which was easy to make, out of pieces of meat and smoked lard on a skewer roasted over fire. The recipe of the Leskovački ćevap ("Leskovac ćevap"), a local specialty of Serbia, was based on traditional pljeskavica (meat patty), formed as ćevap.

Leskovac has a long history of grill shops. In Belgrade, ćevapčići first came from Leskovac in the 1860s, into the kafana "Rajić" at the Great Marketplace (today Studentski Trg), from where they quickly spread across the city, and subsequently, country. The industry quickly multiplied, as ćevapčići was the drinking public's favourite.

The ćevapčići were served at shops, known as ćevabdžija ( ćevabdžije). According to a 1927–28 study in Belgrade, people either ate in the restaurant or outside ("on the kaldrma"), often take-away. The shops served from early morning to 10 AM; often the dish was bought for breakfast.

Before the 1930s, they spread to the rest of Yugoslavia, including east of Serbia and the Macedonia region. By 1932, ćevapčići were regarded a local specialty in southern Serbia, Skopje and Peć. In 1933, the first street food vendor appeared in Maribor, Slovenia, who came from Leskovac, and served grilled meat, including ćevapčići. In 1940, ten pieces cost one Yugoslav dinar. In the second half of the 20th century, ćevapčići and other Oriental dishes entered Croatian cuisine. The Leskovac-styled grilled meat, including ćevapčići, have today become part of everyday-diet in Slovenia. Today, ćevapčići are found outside former Yugoslavia in the diaspora communities.

Today, the grill shops are known as ćevabdžinica (pl. ćevabdžinice).

Leskovac organizes an annual grill festival, the Leskovac Grill Festival, as a showcase of ćevapi and other grilled meat.

Varieties 
 

In Bosnia and Herzegovina, each bigger city or region has its own recipe. While Sarajevo-style ćevapi (Sarajevski ćevapi) are the most popular, Banja Luka-style ćevapi (Banjalučki ćevapi) differ from all others because they are prepared as a meat tile typically consisting of four ćevapi connected in a row. They are usually made just with ground beef, salt, and pepper, just like Sarajevo ćevapi, but ground veal and garlic are sometimes also added to the mix. 
 
Travnički ćevapi originates from the city of Travnik in Bosnia and Herzegovina. The ćevapi are made with a combination of beef, veal, mutton, and lamb, with the addition of salt, pepper, and a bit of baking soda. When grilled, the meat is often brushed with a clear broth that was prepared with beef bones and mutton.
 
Tuzlanski ćevapi comes from Tuzla. The small meat logs are usually made with a combination of ground mutton, beef, and lamb (usually in a ratio of 2:1:1), although some places prepare them only with beef. The meat is mixed by hand and seasoned with salt and pepper, and it is recommended to leave the meat combination in the refrigerator for a few hours or a whole day before the preparation.

There are variations in meat content and seasoning, usually salt and pepper. The dish is kept simple, and traditionally served with flatbread with chopped onions and/or kajmak and yogurt as appetizer.

See also

Mititei, a Romanian dish
Kebapche, a Bulgarian dish

References

External links

 The Original Cevapcici by ORF.at

The Most Stressful Restaurant Experience Ever

Barbecue
Balkan cuisine
Albanian cuisine
Bosnia and Herzegovina cuisine
Bulgarian cuisine
Croatian cuisine
Macedonian cuisine
Montenegrin cuisine
Serbian cuisine
Slovenian cuisine
National dishes
Ground meat
Kosovan cuisine
Romanian cuisine
Romani cuisine